Bonifacio Pinedo (died 1954) was a king of Bolivia as the Afro-Bolivian king. Born in the tropical regions of Yungas in Bolivia, his monarchy is one of the few traditional African monarchies that has survived the vicissitudes of the middle passage and subsequent slavery. He was the grandfather of the current king, Julio Pinedo, and was descended from Uchicho, a prince from the Kongo kingdom who was transported to Bolivia in 1820. 

According to the story as told by Bonifacio Pinedo, he was the oldest member of the Afro-Bolivian community, a direct descendant of a noble African tribe that resided in the Congo at a time before France and Belgium colonized the region. In the colonial era, the dynasty was brought to the New World by the Spanish conquerors as slaves.

Afro-Bolivian people
People from La Paz Department (Bolivia)
Bolivian politicians
1954 deaths
Year of birth missing